The 1914 Duquesne Dukes football team represented Duquesne University during the 1914 college football season. The head coach was Norman "Bill" Budd, coaching his second season with the Dukes.

Schedule

References

Duquesne
Duquesne Dukes football seasons
Duquesne Dukes football